In complex analysis and geometric function theory, the Grunsky matrices, or Grunsky operators, are infinite matrices introduced in 1939 by Helmut Grunsky. The matrices correspond to either a single holomorphic function on the unit disk or a pair of holomorphic functions on the unit disk and its complement. The Grunsky inequalities express boundedness properties of these matrices, which in general are contraction operators or in important special cases unitary operators. As Grunsky showed, these inequalities hold if and only if the holomorphic function is univalent. The inequalities are equivalent to the inequalities of Goluzin, discovered in 1947. Roughly speaking, the Grunsky inequalities give information on the coefficients of the logarithm of a univalent function; later generalizations by Milin, starting from the Lebedev–Milin inequality, succeeded in exponentiating the inequalities to obtain inequalities for the coefficients of the univalent function itself. The Grunsky matrix and its associated inequalities were originally formulated in a more general setting of univalent functions between a region bounded by finitely many sufficiently smooth Jordan curves and its complement: the results of Grunsky, Goluzin and Milin generalize to that case.

Historically the inequalities for the disk were used in proving special cases of the Bieberbach conjecture up to the sixth coefficient; the exponentiated inequalities of Milin were used by de Branges in the final solution.
The Grunsky operators and their Fredholm determinants are also related to spectral properties of bounded domains in the complex plane. The operators have further applications in conformal mapping, Teichmüller theory and conformal field theory.

Grunsky Matrix  
If f(z) is a holomorphic univalent function on the unit disk, normalized so that f(0) = 0 and f′(0) = 1, the function

is a non-vanishing univalent function on |z| > 1 having a simple pole at ∞ with residue 1:

The same inversion formula applied to g gives back f and establishes a one-one correspondence between these two classes of function.

The Grunsky matrix (cnm) of g is defined by the equation

It is a symmetric matrix. Its entries are called the Grunsky coefficients of g.

Note that

so that the coefficients can be expressed directly in terms of f. Indeed, if

then for m, n > 0

and d0n = dn0 is given by

with

Grunsky inequalities
If f is a holomorphic function on the unit disk with Grunsky matrix (cnm), the Grunsky inequalities state that

for any finite sequence of complex numbers λ1, ..., λN.

Faber polynomials
The Grunsky coefficients of a normalized univalent function in |z| > 1

are polynomials in the coefficients bi which can be computed recursively in terms of the Faber polynomials Φn, a monic polynomial of degree n depending on g.

Taking the derivative in z of the defining relation of the Grunsky coefficients and multiplying by z gives

The Faber polynomials are defined by the relation

Dividing this relation by z and integrating between z and ∞ gives

This gives the recurrence relations for n > 0

with

Thus

so that for n ≥ 1

The latter property uniquely determines the Faber polynomial of g.

Milin's area theorem
Let g(z) be a univalent function on |z| > 1 normalized so that

and let f(z) be a non-constant holomorphic function on C.

If

is the Laurent expansion on z > 1, then

Proof
If Ω is a bounded open region with smooth boundary ∂Ω and h is a differentiable function on Ω extending to a continuous function on the closure, then, by Stokes' theorem applied to the differential 1-form 

For r > 1, let Ωr be the complement of the image of |z|> r under g(z), a bounded domain. Then, by the above identity with h = f′, the area of f(Ωr) is given by

Hence

Since the area is non-negative

The result follows by letting r decrease to 1.

Milin's proof of Grunsky inequalities

If

then

Applying Milin's area theorem,

(Equality holds here if and only if the complement of the image of g has Lebesgue measure zero.)

So a fortiori

Hence the symmetric matrix

regarded as an operator on CN with its standard inner product, satisfies

So by the Cauchy–Schwarz inequality

With

this gives the Grunsky inequality:

Criterion for univalence
Let g(z) be a holomorphic function on z > 1 with

Then g is univalent if and only if the Grunsky coefficients of g satisfy the Grunsky inequalities for all N.

In fact the conditions have already been shown to be necessary. To see sufficiency, note that

makes sense when |z| and |ζ| are large and hence the coefficients cmn are defined. If the Grunsky inequalities are satisfied then it is easy to see that the |cmn| are uniformly bounded and hence the expansion on the left hand side converges for |z| > 1 and |ζ| > 1. Exponentiating both sides, this implies that g is univalent.

Pairs of univalent functions
Let  and  be univalent holomorphic functions on |z| < 1 and |ζ| > 1, such that their images are disjoint in C. Suppose that these functions are normalized so that

and

with a ≠ 0 and

The Grunsky matrix (cmn) of this pair of functions is defined for all non-zero m and n by the formulas:

with

so that (cmn) is a symmetric matrix.

In 1972 the American mathematician James Hummel extended the Grunsky inequalities to this matrix, proving that for any sequence of complex numbers λ±1, ..., λ±N

The proof proceeds by computing the area of the image of the complement of the images of |z| < r < 1 under F and |ζ| > R > 1 under g under a suitable Laurent polynomial h(w).

Then:

The area equals

where C1 is the image of the circle |ζ| = R under g and C2 is the image of the circle |z| = r under F.

Hence

Since the area is positive, the right hand side must also be positive. Letting r increase to 1 and R decrease to 1, it follows that

with equality if and only if the complement of the images has Lebesgue measure zero.

As in the case of a single function g, this implies the required inequality.

Unitarity
The matrix

of a single function g or a pair of functions F, g is unitary if and only if the complement of the image of g or the union of the images of F and g has Lebesgue measure zero. So, roughly speaking, in the case of one function the image is a slit region in the complex plane; and in the case of two functions the two regions are separated by a closed Jordan curve.

In fact the infinite matrix A acting on the Hilbert space of square summable sequences satisfies

But if J denotes complex conjugation of a sequence, then

since A is symmetric. Hence

so that A is unitary.

Equivalent forms of Grunsky inequalities

Goluzin inequalities
If g(z) is a normalized univalent function in |z| > 1, z1, ..., zN are distinct points with |zn| > 1 and α1, ..., αN are complex numbers, the Goluzin inequalities, proved in 1947 by the Russian mathematician Gennadi Mikhailovich Goluzin (1906-1953), state that

To deduce them from the Grunsky inequalities, let

for k > 0.

Conversely the Grunsky inequalities follow from the Goluzin inequalities by taking

where

with r > 1, tending to ∞.

Bergman–Schiffer inequalities

Let f(z) be a normalized univalent function in |z| < 1, let z1, ..., zN be distinct points with |zn| < 1 and let α1, ..., αN be complex numbers. The Bergman-Schiffer inequalities state that

To deduce these inequalities from the Grunsky inequalities, set

for k > 0.

Conversely the Grunsky inequalities follow from the Bergman-Schiffer inequalities by taking

where

with r < 1, tending to 0.

Applications

The Grunsky inequalities imply many inequalities for univalent functions. They were also used by Schiffer and Charzynski in 1960 to give a completely elementary proof of the Bieberbach conjecture for the fourth coefficient; a far more complicated proof had previously been found by Schiffer and Garabedian in 1955. In 1968 Pedersen and Ozawa independently used the Grunsky inequalities to prove the conjecture for the sixth coefficient.

In the proof of Schiffer and Charzynski, if

is a normalized univalent function in |z| < 1, then

is an odd univalent function in |z| > 1.

Combining Gronwall's area theorem for f with the Grunsky inequalities for the first 2 x 2 minor of the Grunsky matrix of g leads to a bound for |a4| in terms of a simple function of a2 and a free complex parameter. The free parameter can be chosen so that the bound becomes a function of half the modulus of a2 and it can then be checked directly that this function is no greater than 4 on the range [0,1].

As Milin showed, the Grunsky inequalities can be exponentiated. The simplest case proceeds by writing

with an(w) holomorphic in |w| < 1.

The Grunsky inequalities, with λn = wn imply that

On the other hand, if

as formal power series, then the first of the Lebedev–Milin inequalities (1965) states that

Equivalently the inequality states that if g(z) is a polynomial with g(0) = 0, then

where A is the area of g(D),

To prove the inequality, note that the coefficients are determined by the recursive formula

so that by the Cauchy–Schwarz inequality

The quantities cn obtained by imposing equality here:

satisfy  and hence, reversing the steps,

In particular defining bn(w) by the identity

the following inequality must hold for |w| < 1

Beurling transform

It thus defines a unitary operator. It can also be defined directly as a principal value integral

For any bounded open region Ω in C it defines a bounded operator TΩ  from the conjugate of the Bergman space of Ω onto the Bergman space of Ω: a square integrable holomorphic function is extended to 0 off Ω to produce a function in L2(C) to which T is applied and the result restricted to Ω, where it is holomorphic. If f is a holomorphic univalent map from the unit disk D onto Ω then the Bergman space of Ω and its conjugate can be identified with that of D and TΩ  becomes the singular integral operator with kernel

It defines a contraction. On the other hand, it can be checked that TD = 0 by computing directly on powers  using Stokes theorem to transfer the integral to the boundary.

It follows that the operator with kernel

acts as a contraction on the conjugate of the Bergman space of D. Hence, if

then

Grunsky operator and Fredholm determinant

If Ω is a bounded domain in C with smooth boundary, the operator TΩ can be regarded as a bounded antilinear contractive operator on the Bergman space H = A2(Ω). It is given by the formula

for u in the Hilbert space H= A2(Ω). TΩ is called the Grunsky operator of Ω (or f). Its realization on D using a univalent function f mapping D onto Ω and the fact that TD = 0 shows that it is given by restriction of the kernel

and is therefore a Hilbert–Schmidt operator.

The antilinear operator T = TΩ satisfies the self-adjointness relation

for u, v in H.

Thus A = T2 is a compact self-adjont linear operator on H with

so that A is a positive operator. By the spectral theorem for compact self-adjoint operators, there is an orthonormal basis un of H consisting of eigenvectors of A:

where μn is non-negative by the positivity of A. Hence

with λn ≥ 0. Since T commutes with A, it leaves its eigenspaces invariant. The positivity relation shows that it acts trivially on the zero eigenspace. The other non-zero eigenspaces are all finite-dimensional and mutually orthogonal. Thus an orthonormal basis can be chosen on each eigenspace so that:

(Note that  by antilinearity of T.)

The non-zero λn (or sometimes their reciprocals) are called the Fredholm eigenvalues of Ω:

If Ω is a bounded domain that is not a disk, Ahlfors showed that

The Fredholm determinant for the domain Ω is defined by

Note that this makes sense because A = T2 is a trace class operator.

 showed that if  and f fixes 0, then

Here the norms are in the Bergman spaces of D and its complement Dc and g is a univalent map from Dc onto Ωc fixing ∞.

A similar formula applies in the case of a pair of univalent functions (see below).

Singular integral operators on a closed curve

Let Ω be a bounded simply connected domain in C with smooth boundary C = ∂Ω. Thus there is a univalent holomorphic map f from the unit disk D onto Ω extending to a smooth map between the boundaries S1 and C.

Notes

References

.

 

Complex analysis
Moduli theory
Operator theory